Great Valley Corporate Center is a business park community in East Whiteland, Pennsylvania (Malvern address), located off U.S. Route 202.
Seven hotels serve the Great Valley area: Wyndham Garden Exton Valley Forge, Homewood Suites by Hilton, Courtyard by Marriott, Desmond Hotel, Holiday Inn Express, Staybridge Suites, Homestead Studio Suites, and Extended StayAmerica.

References

Business parks of the United States